Dextella flavus is a moth of the family Erebidae first described by Michael Fibiger in 2011. It is found in western Malaysia (it was described from western Pahang).

The wingspan is about 11 mm. The forewings are short and relatively narrow and the ground colour is beige. There are blackish-brown patches basally on the costa and also in the upper medial and terminal areas. The crosslines are weakly marked and light brown. The terminal line is indicated by black-brown interveinal dots. The hindwing ground colour is grey with a well-marked discal spot.

References

Micronoctuini
Moths described in 2011
Taxa named by Michael Fibiger